Reginaldo Artur Faife (born 14 June 1990), known simply as Reginaldo, is a Mozambican professional footballer who plays as a forward for Kategoria e Parë club Dinamo Tirana.

Club career

Luftëtari Gjirokastër
On 1 September 2016, Reginaldo joined Albanian club Luftëtari Gjirokastër by penning a one-year contract. During the course of 2016–17 season, Reginaldo made 32 league appearances, scoring 8 goals and providing 4 assists, and Luftëtari finished the season in a respectable 4th place. Following the expiration of his contract, Reginaldo left the club and become a free agent.

Laçi
On 1 August 2017, Reginaldo joined fellow Albanian Superliga side Laçi as a free agent. He missed the opening five championship matches due to injury, only returning to first-team matches in October, making his competitive debut on 16 October in the matchday 6 against Flamurtari Vlorë, scoring a penalty kick in a 1–1 draw at Kastrioti Stadium. Only five days later Reginaldo scored a brace in the 3–0 win over newbie Lushnja to help Laçi take 3rd place in the championship.

He started 2018 by netting his team's only goal in the 3–1 loss to Kamza. Then Reginaldo scored in both legs of 2017–18 Albanian Cup quarter-finals against his former team Luftëtari Gjirokastër as Laçi progressed to semi-finals 4–0 on aggregate; he refused to celebrate the goal scored at Luftëtari's home. Later on 10 March, Reginaldo scored his first Albanian Superliga hat-trick in the 4–2 home win versus Flamurtari Vlorë; the feat lifted his tally to 11 goals, breaking his previous record and also reaching double-figures for the first time in career. He also become the first Laçi player to score a hat-trick since Mate Dragičević in March 2011.

On 18 April, Reginaldo scored the decisive away goal in the 1–1 draw at Kukësi in the second leg of cup's semi-final to book Laçi's spot at the final once again. Later on 19 May, he scored inside 50 seconds in the match against Kamza to make it the fastest goal scored in Albanian Superliga for 2017–18 season; Laçi would win the match 2–1.

He left the club on 31 May, four days later losing the Albanian Cup final to Skënderbeu Korçë, finishing the season 21 goals between league and cup, with Laçi returning to European competitions once again. His 18 league goals set the record for the most goals scored by an Laçi player since Altin Çuko in 1995–96 season.

Kukësi
On 20 July 2018, Reginaldo agreed personal terms with Kukësi and signed a one-year contract, taking squad number 90 for the 2018–19 season. The striker made his official debut on 1 August by playing in the second half of 2018–19 UEFA Champions League second qualifying round second leg against Qarabağ which was lost 3–0. Despite the elimination, the team continued their European campaign in the 2018–19 UEFA Europa League, playing in the third qualifying round against Georgia's Torpedo Kutaisi. He initially did not travel with the team to play in the first leg at Ramaz Shengelia Stadium along with Valon Ethemi, Edis Maliqi and Faton Maloku after the Georgian authorities refused their visas. The issue was solved quickly and the players joined the team one day late. He was put as a starter by manager Armando Cungu, but left no mark in the match which was lost 5–2, missing several chances to score. He went on to apologize to the fans afterwards. Reginaldo got his first Kukësi goals in the second leg on 16 August, netting from two penalty kicks to give his team the 2–0 win at Elbasan Arena which was not enough to go through.

Reginaldo begun his domestic season three days later by making his debut in the opening matchday against his former team Laçi. He scored his first league goals for the club on 2 September in form of a hat-trick, his second in the Albanian Superliga, against Tirana for a 3–1 win at Loro Boriçi Stadium.

In the final matchday of the championship, Reginaldo scored two late goals against Kastrioti Krujë to give Kukësi a runner-up finish in league. By doing so, he won the Albanian Superliga Golden Boot with 13 goals in 32 appearances, beating his partner Vasil Shkurti by one goal. He also become only the second player in Kukësi history to win this award, after Pero Pejić.

Shakhter Karagandy
On 9 July 2019, FC Shakhter Karagandy announced the signing of Reginaldo from FK Kukësi.

Kaisar
On 5 February 2020 FC Kaisar announced the signing of Reginaldo.

Akzhayik
On 22 August 2021 FC Akzhayik announced the signing of Reginaldo.

International career
Reginaldo has made 3 appearances with Mozambique national team. His competitive debut occurred on 24 March 2013 in the second qualifying round of 2014 FIFA World Cup against Guinea. That was his only appearance during the qualifying campaign as Mozambique finished Group G in the third place, failing to qualify.

Career statistics

International

International goals
Scores and results list Mozambique's goal tally first.

Honours
FK Kukësi
 Albanian Cup: 2018–19

Individual
 Albanian Superliga Golden Boot: 2018–19

References

External links

1990 births
Living people
People from Zambezia Province
Mozambican footballers
Mozambique international footballers
Mozambican expatriate footballers
C.D. Nacional players
C.D. Santa Clara players
Luftëtari Gjirokastër players
Liga Desportiva de Maputo players
KF Laçi players
FK Kukësi players
FC Shakhter Karagandy players
FC Kaisar players
FC Akzhayik players
Primeira Liga players
Liga Portugal 2 players
Kategoria Superiore players
Kazakhstan Premier League players
Association football forwards
Mozambican expatriate sportspeople in Portugal
Mozambican expatriate sportspeople in Albania
Mozambican expatriate sportspeople in Kazakhstan
Expatriate footballers in Portugal
Expatriate footballers in Albania
Expatriate footballers in Kazakhstan